Fontinalaceae is a family of mosses belonging to the order Isobryales.

Genera:
 Brachelyma Schimp. ex Cardot (1)
 Cryphaeadelphus (Müller Hal.) J.Cardot, 1904
 Dichelyma Myrin (10)
 Fontinalis Hedw. (76)
 Histriomitrium 

Figures in brackets are approx. how many species per genus.

References

Hypnales
Moss families